Mastax annulata is a species of beetle in the family Carabidae that can be found in India.

Distribution
The species has distribution in Himachal Pradesh, Uttar Pradesh and Uttarakhand.

References

Mastax annulata
Beetles described in 1924
Beetles of Asia